The 2015 Auburn Tigers softball team is an American softball team, representing the Auburn University for the 2015 NCAA softball season. In 2014, the Auburn Tigers softball team went 42-19-1 during Clint Myers first season. The Auburn Tigers play their home games at Jane B. Moore Field.

Auburn made it to its first 2015 SEC softball tournament Championship Final on May 9, 2015, held at Tiger Park in Baton Rouge, LA, and defeated #11 Tennessee in extra innings to collect its first SEC Championship in Softball.

Auburn garnered a #4 seed in the 2015 NCAA Division I softball tournament, and hosted a regional and super regional at Jane B. Moore Field in Auburn, AL. Auburn won both the regional and super regional and advanced to their first 2015 Women's College World Series at the ASA Hall of Fame Stadium in Oklahoma City, OK.

Roster 

2015 Auburn Tigers Softball Roster

Schedule

Honors and awards 
 Branndi Melero, Kasey Cooper and Emily Carosone were selected Preaseson All-SEC Team on February 5.
 Emily Carosone named SEC Softball Player of the Week on March 9.
 Emily Carosone named USA Softball National Player of the Week on March 10.
 Morgan Estell and Branndi Melero Selected in National Pro Fastpitch Draft on April 1.
 Branndi Melero named SEC Co-Softball Player of the Week on April 6.
 Emily Carosone named one of 26 Finalists for USA Softball Collegiate Player of the Year on April 8.
 Emily Carosone and Kasey Cooper named to the 1st Team All-SEC Softball Team on May 5.
 Jade Rhodes and Tiffany Howard named to the 2nd Team All-SEC Softball Team on May 5.
 Emily Carosone, Kasey Cooper and Tiffany Howard named to the SEC Softball All-Defensive Team on May 5.
 Clint Myers named 2015 SEC Softball Coach of the Year on May 5.
 Emily Carosone named one of 10 finalists for National Player of Year on May 6.
 Auburn wins 2015 SEC softball tournament Championship on May 9.
 Emily Carosone named 2015 SEC softball tournament Championship MVP on May 9.
 Auburn named host of 2015 NCAA softball tournament Championship Regional and Super Regional on May 10.
 Auburn advances to first Women's College World Series in its history on May 23.
 Emily Carosone and Kasey Cooper named to the NFCA Division I Softball All-American First Team on May 27.
 Tiffany Howard named to the NFCA Division I Softball All-American Third Team on May 27.
 Kasey Cooper named CoSIDA Capital One Academic All-American on May 29.
 Tiffany Howard Named Academic All-American on June 3.
 Carlee Wallace and Branndi Melero named to Women's College World Series All-Tournament Team on June 4.

Ranking movement

References 

Auburn
Auburn Tigers softball seasons
Auburn
Women's College World Series seasons